The Cauldron was a non-profit, independent, esoteric magazine featuring in-depth articles on traditional witchcraft, Wicca, ancient and modern Paganism, magic, and folklore. It was published quarterly in the UK in February, May, August, and November between 1976 and 2015.
It was founded to cater for pagan witches, giving space in particular to non-Gardnerian traditions of witchcraft and so provided some balance to The Wiccan (now Pagan Dawn), the mouthpiece of the Pagan Front (later the Pagan Federation). During its lifetime The Cauldron was edited by Michael Howard who "has been active among pagans and ritual magicians since the early 1960s".

Contributions have included: 
"The Leaves of Hekate – the Plant Lore of the Thessaly Witches" by Daniel A. Schulke, "Land Guardianship" by Sarah Lawless, "Traditional Fairy Lore" by Ronald Hutton.

See also 
 Pagan Dawn, journal of the Pagan Federation
 The Pomegranate, international journal of Pagan Studies
 Quest, quarterly esoteric magazine

References

External links
 The Cauldron
 Pagan Federation (UK)

1976 establishments in the United Kingdom
2015 disestablishments in the United Kingdom
Defunct magazines published in the United Kingdom
Folklore magazines
Magazines established in 1976
Magazines disestablished in 2015
Modern pagan magazines
Modern paganism in the United Kingdom
Quarterly magazines published in the United Kingdom
Western esoteric magazines
Wicca in the United Kingdom
Magazines published in London
1970s in modern paganism